The beech marten (Martes foina), also known as the stone marten, house marten or white breasted marten, is a species of marten native to much of Europe and Central Asia, though it has established a feral population in North America. It is listed as Least Concern on the IUCN Red List on account of its wide distribution, its large population, and its presence in a number of protected areas. It is superficially similar to the European pine marten, but differs from it by its smaller size and habitat preferences. While the pine marten is a forest specialist, the beech marten is a more generalist and adaptable species, occurring in a number of open and forest habitats.

Evolution
Its most likely ancestor is Martes vetus, which also gave rise to the pine marten. The earliest M. vetus fossils were found in deposits dated to the Würm glaciation in Lebanon and Israel. The beech marten likely originated in the Near East or southwestern Asia, and may have arrived in Europe by the Late Pleistocene or the early Holocene. Thus, the beech marten differs from most other European mustelids of the Quaternary, as all other species (save for the European mink) appeared during the Middle Pleistocene. Comparisons between fossil animals and their descendants indicate that the beech marten underwent a decrease in size beginning in the Würm period. Beech martens indigenous to the Aegean Islands represent a relic population with primitive Asiatic affinities.

The skull of the beech marten suggests a higher adaptation than the pine marten toward hypercarnivory, as indicated by its smaller head, shorter snout and its narrower post-orbital constriction and lesser emphasis on cheek teeth. Selective pressures must have acted to increase the beech marten's bite force at the expense of gape. These traits probably acted on male beech martens as a mechanism to avoid both intraspecific competition with females and interspecific competition with the ecologically overlapping pine marten.

Subspecies
, eleven subspecies are recognised.

Description

The beech marten is superficially similar to the pine marten, but has a somewhat longer tail, a more elongated and angular head and has shorter, more rounded and widely spaced ears. Its nose is also of a light peach or grey colour, whereas that of the pine marten is dark black or greyish-black. Its feet are not as densely furred as those of the pine marten, thus making them look less broad, with the paw pads remaining visible even in winter. Because of its shorter limbs, the beech marten's manner of locomotion differs from that of the pine marten; the beech marten moves by creeping in a polecat-like manner, whereas the pine marten and sable move by bounds. The load per 1 cm2 of the supporting surface of the beech marten's foot (30.9 g) is double that of the pine marten (15.2 g), thus it is obliged to avoid snowy regions.

Its skull is similar to that of the pine marten, but differs in its shorter facial region, more convex profile, its larger carnassials and smaller molars. The beech marten's penis is larger than the pine marten's, with the bacula of young beech martens often outsizing those of old pine martens. Males measure 430–590 mm in body length, while females measure 380–470 mm. The tail measures 250–320 mm in males and 230–275 mm in females. Males weigh 1.7–1.8 kg in winter and 2–2.1 kg in summer, while females weigh 1.1–1.3 kg in winter and 1.4–1.5 kg in summer.

The beech marten's fur is coarser than the pine marten's, with elastic guard hairs and less dense underfur. Its summer coat is short, sparse and coarse, and the tail is sparsely furred. The colour tone is lighter than the pine marten's. Unlike the pine marten, its underfur is whitish, rather than greyish. The tail is dark-brown, while the back is darker than that of the pine marten. The throat patch of the beech marten is always white. The patch is large and generally has two projections extending backwards to the base of the forelegs and upward on the legs. The dark colour of the belly juts out between the forelegs as a line into the white colour of the chest and sometimes into the neck. In the pine marten, by contrast, the white colour between the forelegs juts backwards as a protrusion into the belly colour.

Behaviour and ecology

The beech marten is mainly a crepuscular and nocturnal animal, though to a much lesser extent than the European polecat. It is especially active during moonlit nights. Being a more terrestrial animal than the pine marten, the beech marten is less arboreal in its habits, though it can be a skilled climber in heavily forested areas. It is a skilled swimmer, and may occasionally be active during daytime hours, particularly in the summer, when nights are short. It typically hunts on the ground. During heavy snowfalls, the beech marten moves through paths made by hares or skis.

Social and territorial behaviours
Its period of maximum activity occurred between 6 PM and midnight. Between 9 AM and 6 PM, the animal was found to be largely inactive. In urban areas, beech marten's dens are almost entirely in buildings, particularly during winter. The beech marten does not dig burrows, nor does it occupy those of other animals. Instead, it nests in naturally occurring fissures and clefts in rocks, spaces between stones in rock slides and inhabited or uninhabited stone structures. It may live in tree holes at a height of up to 9 metres.

Reproduction and development
Estrus and copulation occur at the same time as in the pine marten. Copulation can last longer than 1 hour. Mating occurs in the June–July period, and takes place in the morning or in moonlit nights on the ground or on the roofs of houses. The gestation period lasts as long as the pine marten's, lasting 236–237 days in the wild, and 254–275 days in fur farms. Parturition takes place in late March-early April, with the average litter consisting of 3-7 kits. The kits are born blind, and begin to see at the age of 30–36 days. The lactation period lasts 40–45 days. In early July, the young are indistinguishable from the adults.

Diet
The beech marten's diet includes a much higher quantity of plant food than that of the pine marten and sable. Plant foods eaten by the beech marten include cherries, apples, pears, plums, black nightshade, tomatoes, grapes, raspberries and mountain ash. Plant food typically predominates during the winter months. Rats, mice and chickens are also eaten. Among bird species preyed upon by the beech marten, sparrow-like birds predominate, though snowcocks and partridges may also be taken. The marten likes to plunder nests of birds including passerines, galliformes and small owls, preferring to kill the parents in addition to the fledglings. Although it rarely attacks poultry, some specimens may become specialized poultry raiders, even when wild prey is abundant. Males tend to target large, live prey more than females, who feed on small prey and carrion with greater frequency.

Relationships with other predators
In areas where the beech marten is sympatric with the pine marten, the two species avoid competing with one another by assuming different ecological niches; the pine marten feeds on birds and rodents more frequently, while the beech marten feeds on fruits and insects. There is however one case of a subadult beech marten being killed by a pine marten. The beech marten has been known to kill European polecats on rare occasions. Red foxes, lynxes and mountain lions may prey on adults, and juveniles are vulnerable from attack by birds of prey and wildcats. There is, however one case, from Germany, of a beech marten killing a domestic cat.

Range
The beech marten is a widespread species which occurs throughout much of Europe and Central Asia. It occurs from Spain and Portugal in the west, through Central and Southern Europe, the Middle East and Central Asia, extending as far east as the Altai and Tien Shan mountains and northwest China. Within Europe, the species is absent in the British Isles, Scandinavian peninsula, Finland, Denmark, the northern Baltic and northern European Russia. It occurs in Afghanistan, Pakistan, India, Nepal, Bhutan and was recently confirmed to inhabit northern Burma.

Introduction in North America
The beech marten is present in Wisconsin, particularly near the urban centres surrounding Milwaukee. It is also present in several wooded, upland areas in the Kettle Moraine State Forest, and in nearby woodlands of Walworth, Racine, Waukesha and probably Jefferson Counties. North American beech martens are likely descended from feral animals that escaped a private fur farm in Burlington during the 1940s. They have also been listed as being released or having escaped in 1972.

Relationships with humans

Tameability
British zoologist George Rolleston theorised that the "domestic cat" of the Ancient Greeks and Romans was in fact the beech marten.  Pioneering marine biologist Jeanne Villepreux-Power kept two tame beech martens.

Hunting and fur use
Although the beech marten is a valuable animal to the fur trade, its pelt is inferior in quality to that of the pine marten and sable. Beech marten skins on the fur markets of the Soviet Union accounted for only 10-12% of the market presence of pine marten skins. Beech martens were caught only in the Caucasus, in the Montane part of Crimea and (in very small numbers) in the rest of Ukraine, and in the republics of Middle Asia. Because animals with more valuable pelts are rare in those areas, the beech marten is of value to hunters on the local market. Beech martens are captured with jaw traps, or, for live capture, with cage traps. The shooting of beech martens is inefficient, and trailing them with dogs is only successful when the animal can be trapped in a tree hollow.

Car damage
Since the mid-1970s, the beech marten has been known to occasionally cause damage to cars. Cars attacked by martens typically have cut tubes and cables. The reason for this behaviour is not fully known, as the damaged items are not eaten. There is, however, a seasonal peak in marten attacks on cars in spring, when young martens explore their surroundings more often and have yet to learn which items in their habitat are edible or not.

Large Hadron Collider
On 29 April and 21 November 2016, two beech martens shut down the Large Hadron Collider, the world's most powerful particle accelerator, by climbing on 18–66 kV electrical transformers located above ground near the LHCb and ALICE experiments, respectively. The second marten was stuffed and put on display in the Rotterdam Natural History Museum.

References

Bibliography

 

Martens
Mammals of Afghanistan
Carnivorans of Europe
Mammals of Western Asia
Mammals of Azerbaijan
Mammals of Pakistan
Mammals of China
Mammals of India
Mammals of Central Asia
Mammals described in 1777
Taxa named by Johann Christian Polycarp Erxleben